Zaozerye is a rural locality (a village) in Fominskoye Rural Settlement, Gorokhovetsky District, Vladimir Oblast, Russia. The population was 9 as of 2010. There are 2 streets.

Geography 
Zaozerye is located on the Krivtsovo Lake, 43 km southwest of Gorokhovets (the district's administrative centre) by road. Fominki is the nearest rural locality.

References 

Rural localities in Gorokhovetsky District